For people with the given name, see Aliko (given name).

Aliko is a village and a former commune in Vlorë County, southern Albania. At the 2015 local government reform it became a subdivision of the municipality Finiq.

Besides the village Aliko from which it takes its name and which functions as well as an administrative center, the administrative unit consists of 9 other villages: Çaush; Dritas; Halo; Jermë; Neohor; Pllakë; Rahullë; Tremul; and Vurgu i Ri, which are inhabited solely by Greeks.

Population
The population according to the 2011 census was 3,849;  according to the civil offices, which count all citizens including those who live abroad, it was 8,818, The latest official census in Albania (2011), has been widely disputed due to irregularities in the procedure, and its results affected by boycott by part of the Greek minority.

References

Administrative units of Finiq
Former municipalities in Vlorë County
Epirus
Villages in Vlorë County
Greek communities in Albania
Villages in Albania
Labëria